Tetraneura yezoensis, also known as Tetraneura (Tetraneura) yezoensis, is an aphid in the superfamily Aphidoidea in the order Hemiptera. It is a true bug and sucks sap from plants.

References 

 http://animaldiversity.org/accounts/Tetraneura_yezoensis/classification/
 http://www.nbair.res.in/Aphids/Tetraneura-yezoensis.php
 https://www.uniprot.org/uniprot/A0A096VKA3
 http://aphid.speciesfile.org/Common/basic/Taxa.aspx?TaxonNameID=1161270

Agricultural pest insects
Insects described in 1917
Eriosomatinae